Charlotte Wood  (born 1965) is an Australian novelist. The Australian newspaper described Wood as "one of our [Australia's] most original and provocative writers".

Biography
Wood was born in Cooma, New South Wales. She is the author of six novels – Pieces of a Girl (1999), The Submerged Cathedral (2004), The Children (2007), Animal People (2011), The Natural Way of Things (2015) and The Weekend (2019). She has also written a collection of interviews with Australian writers, The Writer's Room (2016), a collection of personal reflections on cooking, Love & Hunger (2012). She was also editor of an anthology of writing about siblings, Brothers & Sisters (2009).

Her books have been critically well received and frequently mentioned in prize lists. In 2016 The Natural Way of Things won the Stella Prize, the Indie Book Awards Novel of the Year and Book of the Year, and was short-listed for various other prizes including the Miles Franklin and Barbara Jefferis. Animal People was shortlisted for the NSW Premier's Literary Awards in 2013 and longlisted for the 2012 Miles Franklin Award. She has a background in journalism and has also taught writing at a variety of levels.

In 2014 she was appointed Chair of Arts Practice, Literature, at the Australia Council for the Arts, a three-year appointment cut short by budget restrictions to one year.

She currently lives in Sydney. She has a PhD from the University of New South Wales; previous degrees are a Master of Creative Arts from UTS and a BA from Charles Sturt University.

In May 2016, it was announced that Wood won the Writer in Residence Fellowship at the University of Sydney's Charles Perkins Centre. As an Honorary Associate, Wood has been working with health specialists to offer literary views on the complex topic of ageing. Bringing together award-winning novelists and world-leading researchers at the Charles Perkins Centre has been a "game changer".

Awards and honours

 1999 – Jim Hamilton Prize, winner, Pieces of a Girl
 2000 – Dobbie Award, winner, Pieces of a Girl
2005 – Miles Franklin Award, shortlisted, The Submerged Cathedral
2005 – Commonwealth Writers' Prize, Asia Pacific region, shortlisted, The Submerged Cathedral
 2007 – Australian Book Industry Awards, literary fiction, shortlisted, The Children
2012 – Miles Franklin Award, longlisted, Animal People
2012 – Kibble Prize, shortlisted, Animal People
 2013 – Christina Stead Prize for Fiction, shortlisted, Animal People
2013 – People's Choice Award, NSW Premier's Literary Awards, winner, Animal People
 2016 – Writer in Residence Fellowship at the University of Sydney’s Charles Perkins Centre
2016 – Stella Prize, winner, The Natural Way of Things
 2019 – Member of the Order of Australia, 2019 Queen's Birthday Honours in recognition of her "significant service to literature"
 2019 – The Australian Financial Review, 100 Women of Influence award for Arts, Culture and Sport
 2020 – Stella Prize, shortlisted, The Weekend
2020 – Miles Franklin Award, longlisted, The Weekend
2020 – ALS Gold Medal, shortlisted, The Weekend
2021 – Christina Stead Prize for Fiction, shortlisted for The Weekend

Bibliography
 Pieces of a Girl (1999) 
 The Submerged Cathedral (2004)
 The Children (2007) 
 Brothers & Sisters (editor) (2009) – stories by 12 Australian writers including Nam Le, Christos Tsiolkas, Tegan Bennett Daylight, Cate Kennedy and others.
 Animal People ( October 2011)
 Love and Hunger (2012)
 The Natural Way of Things (2015)
 The Writer's Room: Conversations About Writing (2016)
 The Weekend (2019)

Interviews
 First Tuesday Book Club
 ABC Radio National – Life Matters
 ABC  Radio National – The Book Show
 Readings Booksellers Website

References

External links
 Charlotte Wood’s website
 Random House author page

Living people
1965 births
People from Cooma
Charles Sturt University alumni
University of Technology Sydney alumni
Australian women novelists